
This is a list of bridges documented by the Historic American Engineering Record in the US state of Washington.

Bridges

See also
List of tunnels documented by the Historic American Engineering Record in Washington (state)

References

List
List
Washington (state)
Bridges, HAER
Bridges, HAER